The Pirie–Torrens corridor is an approximately  long intermittent watercourse that serves as the only natural outlet of Lake Torrens, a large normally endorheic salt lake in central South Australia.

Only on two recorded occasions — in 1836, and again in March 1989 — has Lake Torrens filled high enough to flow out through the corridor to its outlet at the head of the Spencer Gulf.

The Wikipedia Lake Torrens entry states that the corridor likely flowed in 1897.

References

Rivers of South Australia
Far North (South Australia)
Gawler bioregion